Mann Field was a ballpark located in Newport, Arkansas, United States that served as the home stadium to the Newport Cardinals (1936–1938) and Newport Dodgers (1940–1941). Built in the 1930s, it was named after Louis P. Mann, superintendent of Newport High School, where the field was located. It was a Works Progress Administration project.

In its history, it was also known as Greyhound Field and Memorial Field.

References

Defunct minor league baseball venues
Baseball venues in Arkansas
Defunct sports venues in Arkansas
1930s establishments in Arkansas
Works Progress Administration in Arkansas
Newport, Arkansas
Buildings and structures in Jackson County, Arkansas
Buildings and structures completed in the 1930s